The Way It Is is Valerie Carter's third solo album. This album features background vocals by James Taylor, Linda Ronstadt, Jackson Browne, Lyle Lovett, Phoebe Snow, David Lasley, Arnold McCuller and Kate Markowitz.

Critical reception

Rob Caldwell of AllMusic gives the album 3 out of 5 stars and writes, "Following the pattern of her debut, it featured a fine selection of songs and a fine array of guest performers."

Charles Donovan of Pop Matters had this to say of the album, "Wild Child marked the end of Carter's time with Columbia. Busy with backing vocals and some songwriting here and there in the 1980s, she wouldn't re-emerge as a solo artist until 1996, when she cut The Way It Is for the Japanese Pony Canyon label. It was a tremendous return."

Track listing

Track information verified from the album's liner notes and cross referenced with 45 Worlds.

Personnel
Valerie Carter - lead vocals
Arnold McCuller, David Lasley, Edwin McCain, Jackson Browne, James Taylor, Kate Markowitz, Linda Ronstadt, Lyle Lovett, Phoebe Snow, Sweet Pea Atkinson - backing vocals
Kevin McCormick - bass
Mauricio Lewak - drums
James Harrah - guitar
Mark Goldenberg - guitar, keyboards, accordion
Debra Dobkin - percussion
Scott Plunkett - piano, keyboards
Joe Sublette - saxophone
Novi Novog - viola
Technical
Producer – Mark Goldenberg
Producer, Recorded By, Mixed By – Eddy Offord

Personnel information retrieved from Discogs.

References

External links
Valerie Carter Official Site
Pony Canyon Records Official Site

1996 albums
albums produced by Eddy Offord
Pony Canyon albums